Dactyloceras swanzii is a moth in the family Brahmaeidae. It was described by Arthur Gardiner Butler in 1871. It is found in Ghana, Guinea, Nigeria and South Africa.

References

Arctiidae genus list at Butterflies and Moths of the World of the Natural History Museum

Brahmaeidae
Moths described in 1871